Vijay Kumar Raina is an Indian geologist and glaciologist, and author of a controversial discussion paper from India's Ministry of Environment and Forests regarding Himalayan glaciers. He was formerly deputy director-general of the Geological Survey of India, and led two scientific expeditions conducted by the Indian Antarctic Program.

Career
He is also co-author of "Glacier, Atlas of India" which is a collection of photographs and descriptions of glaciers.

External links
"Himalayan Glaciers: A State-of-Art Review of Glacial Studies, Glacial Retreat and Climate Change"

References 

Indian glaciologists
Living people
Indian geologists
Year of birth missing (living people)